Filiz İşikırık (born August 20, 1993, in Siverek, Şanlıurfa, Turkey) is a Turkish women's football forward  currently playing in the Turkish Women's First Football League for Ataşehir Belediyespor with jersey number 63. She appeared in the Turkey women's national football team.

Playing career

Club
İşikırık obtained her license on February 5, 2009, for Gazikentspor. After playing one season in the Women's Second League and capping four times, she transferred to Gölcükspor. At the end of her first season, she enjoyed promotion of her team to the Women's First League. For Gölcükspor, İşikırık capped 36 times and netted 42 goals before she signed with Lüleburgaz 39 Spor for the 2011–12 season. She scored 17 goals in 19 matches in one season for Lüleburgaz 39 Spor. İşikırık was with Trabzon İdmanocağı two seasons from the 2012–13 season.

She transferred to the Third League team 76 Iğdır Spor in the beginning of 2015. The next year, İşikırık signed with the Istanbul-based club Atalehir Belediyespor to play in the Women's First league again.

International
She played two matches for the Turkey national U-17 team, and 12 matches for the Turkey national U-19 team. She was twice in the Turkey nationals.

Career statistics

Honours
 Turkish Women's First League
 Ataşehir Belediyespor
 Runners-up (1): 2015–16

References

Living people
1993 births
People from Siverek
Turkish women's footballers
Women's association football forwards
Turkey women's international footballers
Gazikentspor players
Gölcükspor players
Lüleburgaz 39 Spor players
Trabzon İdmanocağı women's players
Ataşehir Belediyespor players
21st-century Turkish sportswomen